Volodymyrivka, in Ukraine, is the site of an ancient mega-settlement belonging to the Cucuteni–Trypillia culture dating to 4000-3600 BC.

It is conditionally named after the village where it is located, Volodymyrivka (Kirovohrad Oblast). The settlement was for the time very large, covering an area of 100 hectares. This proto-city is just one of 2,440 Cucuteni-Trypillia settlements discovered so far in Moldova and Ukraine. 194 (8%) of these settlements had an area of more than 10 hectares between 5000 and 2700 BC and more than 29 settlements had an area in the range of 100 to 450 hectares.

See also
 Cucuteni–Trypillia culture
 Danubian culture

References

Cucuteni–Trypillia culture
Tourist attractions in Kirovohrad Oblast
Archaeological sites in Ukraine